John the Exarch (also transcribed Joan Ekzarh) was a medieval Bulgarian scholar, writer and translator, one of the most important men of letters working at the Preslav Literary School at the end of the 9th and the beginning of the 10th century. He was active during the reign of Boris I (852–889) and his son Simeon I (893–927). His most famous work is the compilation Shestodnev (Шестоднев – Hexameron) that consists of both translations of earlier Byzantine authors and original writings. In a manuscripts of the Gospels, held in the National Library of Serbia, an alternative date is given, namely — .

Life 

Evidence about his life is scarce but his literary legacy suggests an excellent knowledge of Greek language. It is therefore assumed that John the Exarch received his education in the Byzantine Empire. Some historians assume that his sobriquet "the Exarch" means that he was the Archbishop of Bulgaria. Others suggest that this was not an bishopric rank. There are also theories that identify John the Exarch with Chernorizets Hrabar or with John of Rila.

Literary activities 
John the Exarch's literary work includes a number of translations of medieval Byzantine authors, the most important of which is the translation, around 895, of On Orthodox Christianity by the Byzantine theologian John of Damascus. He is also the author of several original works and compilations, the most important whereof is the compilation Шестоднев (Shestodnev). The compilation includes parts of the works of several Byzantine authors, most notably Basil the Great, as well as original parts which give valuable first-hand evidence about the Bulgarian Empire under Simeon I (893–927). John the Exarch describes the royal palace and the Bulgarian ruler that includes information about his attire, the boyars, the social stratification of the Bulgarian society and like matters.

Citations

References

Monographs 
 Калайдович, К. Иоанн ексарх болгарский. Москва (1824)
 Архимандрит Панарет, Животът на Йоана Екзарха Български, Станимака (1914)
 Иванова-Мирчева, Д., Йоан Екзарх Български, Слова, т. 1, София (1974)
 Бонов, А. Възгледите за вселената на Йоан Екзарх български. София (1982)
 Чолова, Ц., Естественонаучните знания в средновековна България, София, изд. БАН (1988)
 Баранкова, Г. С., В. В. Мильков. Шестоднев Иоанна екзарха Болгарского. Санкт Петербург (2001)
 Трендафилов, Хр. Йоан Екзарх Български. София (2001)

Articles 
 Vondrák, V., O mluvě Jana Exarcha bulharského, Praha, p. 40–92, p. 95–97 (1896)
 Трифонов, Ю., Сведения из старобългарския живот в "Шестоднева" на Йоан Екзарх, Списание на БАН, т. 35, с. 1–26 (1926)
 Мавродинов, Н., Описание на Преслав в Шестоднева на Йоан Екзарх, ИП, кн. 3, с. 66–76 (1955)
 Миятев, К., Два поетични фрагмента у Йоан Екзарх като исторически извори, Археология, кн. 1–2, с. 9–16 (1959)
 Хаджиолов, А., Йоан Екзарх Български като учен и философ, основоположник на българското естествознание, Проблеми на природата, кн. 8, с. 177 (1978)
 Боев, П., Йоан Екзарх Български – първият наш антрополог, Проблеми на природата, кн. 9 с. 317 (1978)
 Борисов, М., А. Ваврек, В. Кусев, "Йоан Екзарх – първият разпространител на знания в областта на физическите науки у нас", Физика, кн. 1, с. 14–28 (1983)
 Борисов, М., А. Ваврек, Г. Камишева, "Йоан Екзарх Български – пръв разпространител на физически знания у нас", Предшественици на разпространението и развитието на физическите знания в България, София, Народна просвета (1985) с. 5–65
 Чолова, Ц., Върховната власт и управлението в средновековната българска държава по времето на Симеон, отразени в "Шестоднева" на Йоан Екзарх, Известия на Института по история, т. 27, с. 216–235 (1985)

See also
 History of Bulgaria
 Preslav Literary School
 Simeon I of Bulgaria

9th-century births
10th-century deaths
9th-century Bulgarian writers
10th-century Bulgarian writers
Bulgarian male writers
Bulgarian translators
Old Church Slavonic writers
People from Veliki Preslav
Preslav Literary School
Translators from Greek
Translators to Bulgarian